Nitin Tanwar (born 9 October 1996) is an Indian cricketer. He made his first-class debut for Services in the 2017–18 Ranji Trophy on 24 October 2017. He made his List A debut for Services in the 2018–19 Vijay Hazare Trophy on 19 September 2018.

References

External links
 

1996 births
Living people
Indian cricketers
Place of birth missing (living people)
Services cricketers